The Volga class is a class of Russian river passenger ships. It is named after the first ship in the class Volga, which in her turn was named after Volga River.

Three deck cruise ships built by Österreichische Schiffswerften AG at their shipyard in Korneuburg, Austria in 1970.

River cruise ships of the Austrian project Q-031

Overview

See also
 List of river cruise ships
 Valerian Kuybyshev-class motorship
 Rossiya-class motorship (1952)
 Rossiya-class motorship (1973)
 Anton Chekhov-class motorship
 Vladimir Ilyich-class motorship
 Rodina-class motorship
 Baykal-class motorship
 Sergey Yesenin-class motorship
 Oktyabrskaya Revolyutsiya-class motorship
 Yerofey Khabarov-class motorship
 Dunay-class motorship
 Amur-class motorship
 Dmitriy Furmanov-class motorship

References

River cruise ships
Ships of Russia
Ships of the Soviet Union
Austria–Soviet Union relations